Stenocercus prionotus is a species of lizard of the Tropiduridae family. It is found in Peru and Bolivia.

References

Stenocercus
Reptiles described in 2001
Reptiles of Bolivia
Reptiles of Peru